The InterContinental Marseille – Hotel Dieu is a five-star luxury hotel near the Vieux-Port area of Marseille, France. Housed in the Hôtel-Dieu de Marseille building, which served as the city's primary hospital (Hôtel-Dieu) for over eight hundred years, the hotel opened on April 25, 2013, in conjunction with the ongoing Euroméditerranée project. The hotel is part of the InterContinental hotel chain, and it is the fourth InterContinental property in France.

The building sits on the location of the Saint-Esprit Hospital, which was created in 1188. The next six centuries saw the hospital undergo considerable expansion, and the current building was inaugurated by Napoleon III in 1866. In 1963, the building was listed as a registered national monument on the ISMH (Inventaire Supplémentaire des Monuments Historiques). The last patients left in 1993, and in 2003, the hospital was acquired in preparation for development. The property is owned by Paris-based AXA Real Estate.

172 rooms and 22 suites are housed in the hotel, with prices up to $6,600 for the presidential suite. In addition, the hotel hosts two restaurants: "Les Fenêtres Brasserie" and "Alcyone Restaurant", the latter of which is one of four restaurants in Marseille to hold at least one Michelin Star.

History

Hospital
Though the Hotel-Dieu's predecessor was founded in 1188, the Hotel-Dieu in its previous incarnation was founded when the Hospital Saint-Jacques de Galice and the Hospital Saint-Esprit merged in 1593, thus becoming Marseille's largest and foremost hospital. Both hospitals had previously served Marseille in the Black Death epidemic of Bubonic Plague, which first reached Marseille in January 1348. However, the combined Hotel-Dieu first achieved widespread renown when esteemed French ophthalmologist Jacques Daviel made significant advances and developments in cataract surgery, when he performed an extracapsular cataract extraction in 1747 at the Hotel-Dieu.

By 1753, the hospital needed substantial expansion to meet the needs of Marseille, and the current building was built under the direction of the court architect of Louis XV, Jacques Hardouin-Mansart de Sagonne. He was a grandson of the eminent Jules Hardouin-Mansart, a famed architect who represented the height of French Baroque architecture and power.

Benefiting from the financial aid of Jean-Etienne Raymond, the project was completed in 1788, and the hospital did not need additional expansion until 1860. The period between 1860 and 1866 saw the Hotel-Dieu rebuilt and remodeled by renowned architect Felix Blanchet, and the transformed hospital was christened by Napoleon III in November of that year.

Hotel
In 1993, after 805 years of service, the Hotel-Dieu received its last patients, and was converted into a teaching hospital; the hospital completely closed in 2006. Throughout this time, several consortiums were bidding for the redevelopment of the Hotel-Dieu, and four years after the acquisition of the property from the hospital in 2003, it was announced that the site was to become a luxury hotel under the InterContinental brand. Construction and renovations began in 2010, and the rejuvenated Marseille icon reopened on April 25, 2013, about 825 years after the Saint-Esprit Hospital first opened its doors. The hotel's renovations were accomplished by French construction company Eiffage and were developed by Altarea Cogedim.

City Hall
The Marseilles City Hall (Hôtel de ville de Marseille) is located near the harbour port in the 2nd arrondissement and was built in the 17th-century building. The construction of this medium-sized hall dates back to 1653 when Gaspard de Villages, first consul, proposed to the municipal council to build a new city hall. On September 6, 1653, the committee responsible for the works opted to build this new building at the same location as the old one. Etienne de Puget, the bishop, blessed the first stone on October 25, 1653. Jean-Baptiste Méolans, assisted by the engineer Enéas Bilondelle, was responsible for the blueprints, but the lack of funding and the occupation of the city by Louis XIV’s troops in 1660 prevented the construction to go beyond the laying of the foundations.

In 1666, Gaspard Puget, Pierre Puget’s brother, took over the project. François and Mathieu Pourtal (or Portal, both were stonecutters), Martinet, Levaquery and Martin Grosfils worked on the ornaments of the front side. Pierre Puget only realized the escutcheon placed above the main entrance in 1673. The current escutcheon on the front is a replica of the original escutcheon, which is currently kept in the Beaux-Arts museum. The building actually served as the official city hall in 1673, roughly 20 years after the first stone was laid.

Between 1748 and 1752, Mansart de Lévy (Jacques Hardouin-Mansart de Sagonne), the last architect of his family, projected to rebuild the whole city hall, including the royal square in honor of Louis XV. This project was abandoned in favor of the reconstruction of the Hôtel-Dieu located in the backside. This architect had been commissioned on the spot by the king in 1752. His 1769 unsigned order left in Pierre Patte's famous register reads "Monuments built in France for the glory of Louis XV". This building project was little-known by art historians until it was identified in 1994 and published in 1996.

Throughout January and February 1794, during the French Revolution, Marseille was known as the unnamed city (Ville sans nom), the hall narrowly escaped destruction as it was suspected to be the headquarters of the federalists.

In 1914, architect Clastrier replaced the Mansart slate tiles, leaving a completely different design. These old roof tiles were featured in 18th-century engravings and paintings. The city hall is one of the few buildings in this district that was left undamaged by the 1943 German occupation. Following a decree of April 30, 1948, the building is part of the national heritage monument list.

In 1996, a project to extend the monument and to renew the surroundings was submitted. The contest was won by architect Franck Hammoutène in 1999, and the works were completed in 2006. This allowed to renew a total indoor area of 8,300 m2 including a new consultation room, several new council rooms and a museum. The floor above these new rooms hosts a new public space offering 20,000 m2 between the Old Port and the Hotel-Dieu, making it the largest plaza in the city.

Design

Similar to numerous other buildings in Marseille built during the corresponding time period, the Hotel-Dieu exhibited French Baroque architecture, while subsequent improvements added touches reminiscent of French Rococo and Neoclassicism, and later, the Second Empire Style. Like many French buildings, it has a French Garden; the ruins of a 12th-century chapel is buried under it. A cultural exhibition of the hotel showcases some of the artifacts recovered from the chapel, some dating back over 2200 years.

The redevelopment of the Hotel-Dieu was acceded to by AAA Bechu Agency and local Architecture firm, Tangram. Despite the hotel's storied history, the interior is modernistic, reflecting the Art Deco style as well as the traditional colors of the Mediterranean, orchestrated by Jean-Philippe Nuel. The InterContinental also prides itself in its 750m² terrace which can comfortably ensconce 160 people. Furthermore, the five-story hotel features twelve meeting rooms with a combined 1000 square meters of event space.

Rooms
Out of the 194 Rooms and Suites in the hotel, 22 are suites; of which 15 are Junior Suites, 6 are "Prestige Suites", and one is a Presidential Suite. 72 Rooms, including all of the suites, overlook the Vieux-Port.

Restaurants and bars
The InterContinental Marseille features two restaurants both under the direction of Michelin-starred chef Lionel Lévy, formerly the head chef at 'Une table au Sud', itself a Michelin-starred restaurant. The hotel's terrace hosts the Capian Bar

Les Fenêtres Brasserie
The hotel's brasserie, named for the Hotel-Dieu's distinctively arched windows, can seat eighty.

Alcyone Restaurant
The hotel's formal dining restaurant is named after the figure Alcyone in Greek mythology. A few months after its inception, the restaurant was awarded a Michelin star. Aside from the Michelin Guide, other reviewers have also given the restaurant generally positive reviews. The publication France Today illustrated a good impression of the restaurant albeit the restaurant being in a "teething phase", noting that a few tables had a "magical view of the distant city". Prices for a set meal are around 139 Euros.

Awards
At the 2014 MIPIM Awards, a festival that recognizes architectural and design developments, the InterContinental Marseille was awarded the "Best Refurbished Building" award in honor of the regeneration and renewal of the Hotel-Dieu. The building's renovation also gave it the Haute Qualité Environnementale Certification, and thus the hotel became the second building in the hotel industry to receive the award, which awards institutions for green building in France. Moreover, the hotel was included in the 2014 Condé Nast Traveler Hot List, which recognizes the world's finest hotels, along with the Travel + Leisure "It List", honoring the best new hotels as picked by their editors.

Gallery

See also
InterContinental hotel chain
InterContinental Carlton Cannes, also in Southern France
Hôtel-Dieu, for other uses

References

External links
Official website

2nd arrondissement of Marseille
Hotels in France
InterContinental hotels
Hotels established in 2013
2013 establishments in France